The Amable du Fond River is a river in Nipissing District, in Northern Ontario, Canada.

The river is named after Amable Dufond,  a Native hunter and trapper who lived in this area in the mid-19th century. At one time, the river was used to transport logs downstream to the Mattawa River. A timber slide was built to bypass the rapids at the Eau Claire Gorge.

Many canoe trippers use the river as an access point to enter Algonquin Park. But this route is technically difficulty requiring advanced canoeing skills, due to low summer water flow and unmaintained portages and campsites. The park has an access point located on Kawawaymog (Round Lake), from the access point it is just a short paddle and portage into Algonquin Provincial Park.

Geography
The Amable du Fond River flows from Pipe Lake through Kawawaymog, North Tea, Manitou, and Kioshkokwi Lakes in northwestern Algonquin Park to join the Mattawa River on the south side of Samuel de Champlain Provincial Park.

The Amable du Fond River is the remnant of a short-lived drainage of glacial Lake Algonquin into the Mattawa River valley. It is the largest tributary of the Mattawa River.

Eau Claire Gorge
It is protected in the  Eau Claire Gorge Conservation Area, which was purchased by the North Bay-Mattawa Conservation Authority in 1976.

Amable du Fond River Provincial Park

The Amable du Fond River Provincial Park is a waterway park that protects several non-contiguous sections of the river and its banks. It also includes some portions of the shores of Smith Lake. It was established in 2006 and is meant to provide a canoe route between Algonquin and Samuel de Champlain Parks. Other activities include hunting, wildlife/nature viewing, and off-roading with ATV's and snowmobiles.

The park features a marsh-fen complex to the north of Smith Lake, as well as balsam fir-spruce, intolerant hardwood, and red pine-spruce scrubland on the shores of Smith Lake and near Crooked Chute Lake. Its vegetation includes black spruce-white cedar-tamarack bottomland, as well as intolerant hardwoods, mixed conifer, cedar-alder stands, and a riverine wetland complex in the southern portion of the park.

It is a non-operating park, meaning that there are no facilities or services.

See also
List of rivers of Ontario

References

Sources

External links
 
 North Bay Mattawa Conservation Authority

Rivers of Nipissing District